SomBy is a Sámi rock band from the Finnish side of Sápmi that sings in Northern Sámi. The band was founded in Vuotso in 2004. At that point in time, the band consisted solely of girls. Its line-up experienced some changes in November 2007 when two boys from Inari joined.

In 2008, they signed with Tuupa Records, a recording company that represents a number of artists including Skolt Sámi rocker Tiina Sanila. In 2008, they published their first EP and are working on a full-length album to be published in September 2009.

In 2009, the band won the Sámi Grand Prix with their song "Ii iđit vel", the lyrics for which were written by Milla Pulska and set to music by Oula Guttorm. They will be touring the major Sámi music festivals during the summer, including Márkomeannu and Ijahis Idja.

Line-up 
 Miira Suomi, vocals
 Milla Pulska, piano
 Unna-Maari Pulska, drums
 Juho Kiviniemi, bass
 Oula Guttorm, guitar

Liet-Lávlut 2009
 
SomBy won first place at the Liet-Lávlut 2009 competition of minority-language bands.

Čáhppes Lasttat 2008
The band published their first EP "Čáhppes Lasttat" at the Ijahis idja festival on May 24, 2008. The record was produced by Jussi Isokoski.

The EP has the following tracks on it:
1. Duoggi (lyrics: Milla Pulska, music: Oula Guttorm)
2. Gáddálas (lyrics: Milla Pulska and Miira Suomi, music: Oula Guttorm)
3. Unna Jalla (lyrics and music: Milla Pulska)
4. Doarrun Duoddaris (lyrics: Milla Pulska and Miira Suomi, music: Milla Pulska and Oula Guttorm)
5. Ránisvuohta (lyrics and music: Milla Pulska)

References

External links 
 SomBy at MySpace
 Tuupa Records

Sámi musical groups
Finnish rock music groups